The James Parreco House is a historic home located at Greensboro in Greene County, Pennsylvania. It was built about 1910, and is a -story, two bay sandstone dwelling, with Prairie Style design elements.  It has a hipped roof with wide waves and a one-story front porch with massive brick supports.

It was listed on the National Register of Historic Places in 1995.

See also 
 National Register of Historic Places listings in Greene County, Pennsylvania

References 

Houses on the National Register of Historic Places in Pennsylvania
Houses completed in 1910
Houses in Greene County, Pennsylvania
National Register of Historic Places in Greene County, Pennsylvania